In the Name of the Italian People is a 1971 Italian comedy-drama film directed by Dino Risi. It represents a reflection about the crisis of the Italian judiciary and the growing phenomenon of corruption.

Plot
Set in Rome and its surroundings, the film tells in a frighteningly realistic, ruthless and grotesque the evil of two powerful men of Italy in the seventies: a Director of illegal buildings (Vittorio Gassman), extremist fascist, and an upright judge, cynical looking in part to the Italian law (Ugo Tognazzi). Both can not stand each other, given the contrasts between the two men in any social, political and philosophical. Everyone hates each other and would like to delete it, but just because of the bad example that the two men give power to the people, many Italians are adversely affected because of cheating and rudeness of the fascist manufacturer and the communist magistrate. The director Dino Risi  underlines the misdeeds and the weakness of the Italian people to react accordingly, by focusing on the story of these two men who are each other's opposite of the net.

Cast 
 Ugo Tognazzi: Judge Mariano Bonifazi
 Vittorio Gassman: Lorenzo Santenocito
 Yvonne Furneaux: Lavinia Santenocito
 Ely Galleani: Silvana Lazzorini
 Pietro Tordi: Professor Rivaroli
 Simonetta Stefanelli: Giugi Santenocito
 Franco Angrisano: Colombo
 Renato Baldini: Accountant Cerioni
 Checco Durante: Pieronti, the archivist

References

External links

1971 films
Commedia all'italiana
Films directed by Dino Risi
Films scored by Carlo Rustichelli
1971 comedy-drama films
Films with screenplays by Age & Scarpelli
1971 comedy films
1971 drama films
1970s Italian films